Staircase is a two-character play by Charles Dyer about an ageing gay couple who own a barber shop in the East End of London. One of them is a part-time actor about to go on trial for propositioning a police officer. The action takes place over the course of one night as they discuss their loving but often volatile past together and possible future without each other.

The playwright named his characters Charles Dyer (after himself) and Harry C. Leeds, which is an anagram of his name.

In 1966, it was produced by the Royal Shakespeare Company with Paul Scofield and Patrick Magee.

The Broadway production directed by Barry Morse opened on 10 January 1968 at the Biltmore Theatre, where it played for 12 previews and 61 performances. It starred Eli Wallach and Milo O'Shea. O'Shea was nominated for the Tony Award for Best Performance by a Leading Actor in a Play.

In June 2021, Two’s Company revived the play at Southwark Playhouse, London. Reviewing for Everything Theatre  Darren Luke Mawdsley said it is: “…the perfect reminder that the freedoms enjoyed today can never be taken for granted” and gave the production three stars.

The play was profiled in William Goldman's book The Season: A Candid Look at Broadway.

Film adaptation

The play was adapted into a 1969 film by 20th Century Fox, also written by Dyer and directed by Stanley Donen, starring Rex Harrison and Richard Burton as the couple. The film was considered a critical and commercial failure.

References

External links

 (archive) 
Staircase review at Everything Theatre

1966 plays
British plays
Broadway plays
LGBT-related plays